Un esposo para Estela (A Husband for Estela) is a Venezuelan telenovela written by Camilo Hernández based on an original story by Ángel del Cerro and produced by Venevisión in 2009. The telenovela was distributed internationally by Venevisión International.

Daniela Alvarado and Luis Gerónimo Abreu star as the protagonists while Carlota Sosa, Christina Dieckmann, Maria Antoineta Castillo and Carlos Julio Molina star as the antagonists. The telenovela was originally titled Vendaval de Amor before being changed to Un Esposo para Estela.

Plot
In the town of San Jacinto del Morichal, Estela Morales is a young orphan who owns a hacienda in ruins and buried in debt called "El Vendaval". Upon the death of her mother, Estela discovers she needs to get married in order to collect the inheritance her mother left. Desperate and seeking  to get the money as the only way of saving the farm, she places an advertisement in the newspaper seeking for suitable candidates for a husband. Among the many men who respond to the announcement is Adriano Alberti (Luis Gerónimo Abreu) who is  the heir of an international chain of  hotels. He is the candidate who knows or knew her.

A month ago, the two had met on the island of Curaçao during a masquerade party. She wanted to die, he wanted to forget. For one night, these two made love. The next day, the woman disappeared without a trace. Adriano woke up only to discover that an expensive necklace belonging to his family was no longer in the safe. Adriano decided to go to El Vendaval to recover the jewel he thinks Estela stole, but in reality he wants to prove that she is innocent.

Cast
Daniela Alvarado as Estela Morales
Luis Gerónimo Abreu as Adriano Alberti
Marcos Moreno as Feliciano Fundora
Violeta Alemán as Herminia Morales
María Antonieta Castillo as Maria Claudia Morales
Carlos Julio Molina "Trece as Romulo Guevara
Marjorie Magri as Clara Morales
Antonio Delli as José Carlos Guerrero
Bebsabé Duque as Cristina Vega
Sonia Villamizar as  Ornella Guerrero
Carlota Sosa as Lic. Ricarda Roldan de Norigea
Karl Hoffman as Mario Alberti
Stephanie Cayo as Rogeila Guerrero/ Patricia Alberti
Javier Valcárcel as German Urquiza
Verónica Ortiz as Elvira Domínguez
Martin Brassesco as Felipe Vega
Eulalia Siso as Aitana Alberti
Reina Hinojosa as Gilda Domínguez
Christian Mc Gaffney as Delfín Fundora
Greisy Mena as Malena Alberti
Erick Noriega as Pio Doce
Anahí as Roberta
Guillermo García as Dorian Delgado
Mauro Boccia as Dante Delgado
Ludwig Pineda as Emeterio Peréz
Christina Dieckmann as Jennifer Noriega Roldán
Jesús Miranda "El Chino" as El Purri
Adriana Prieto as Celeste
Alicia Plaza as Pricilla
Leopoldo Regnault
Amalia Laurens
Macarena Benitez
Melisa Alvarez
Regino Jiménez

Version
 La mujer del Vendaval with Ariadne Díaz and José Ron for Televisa.

References

External links
 
Un Esposo para Estela on Venevision.net 
Un Esposo para Estela folletio at telenovelasmania 

2009 telenovelas
2009 Venezuelan television series debuts
2010 Venezuelan television series endings
Venezuelan telenovelas
Spanish-language telenovelas
Venevisión telenovelas
Curaçao in fiction
Television shows set in Caracas